Hollinshead is a surname. Notable people with the surname include:

Ariel Hollinshead (born 1929), American cancer researcher
Cyril Hollinshead (1902–1995), English cricketer
Emily Hollinshead (born 1995), Welsh footballer
Shaun Hollinshead (born 1961), English footballer and manager

See also
Henry Blundell-Hollinshead-Blundell (1831–1906), British Army officer and politician
Hollinshead Hall, a ruined manor house in Lancashire, England